Goodenia prostrata is a species of flowering plant in the family Goodeniaceae and is endemic to inland parts of Western Australia. It is a prostrate herb with toothed, lance-shaped leaves at the base of the plant and racemes of yellow flowers with a brownish centre.

Description
Flowering mainly occurs from May to September.

Taxonomy and naming
Goodenia prostrata was first formally described in 1990 by Roger Charles Carolin in the journal Telopea from a specimen he collected  from Roy Hill in 1970. The specific epithet (prostrata) refers to the prostrate habit of this goodenia.

Distribution
This goodenia grows in sandy soil in the Pilbara and nearby regions of Western Australia.

Conservation status
Goodenia prostrata is classified as "not threatened" by the Government of Western Australia Department of Parks and Wildlife.

References

prostrata
Eudicots of Western Australia
Plants described in 1990
Taxa named by Roger Charles Carolin
Endemic flora of Western Australia